5th-seeded Pere Riba successfully defended his 2008 title, winning 7–6(2), 6–2, against qualifier Albert Ramos-Viñolas.

Seeds

Draw

Final four

Top half

Bottom half

References
 Main Draw
 Qualifying Draw

2009
Singles